Taha Fahssi (born 3 August 1996), known by his stage name ElGrandeToto or Toto, is a Moroccan rapper, performing in Darija, French and English (usually mixing between them). He is the most listened artist in the MENA region on Spotify in 2021, with more than 135 million streams in 178 countries.

Biography
Having started his career in 2016, ElGrandeToto quickly enjoyed great success, especially with his song Pablo (2017), which managed to propel him to the forefront of the Moroccan scene.

In 2018, he released his first project, an EP entitled Illicit.

In 2020, Taha was the eighth most streamed Arab artist in MENA on Deezer, and his song “Hors Série” was the seventh most streamed song on the platform. In the same year, he won the title of "Best Hip-Hop/Rap Artist" in the 2020 African Entertainment Awards USA.

In 2020, Fahssi lost his mother and released the song Mghayer in her tribute on 5 January 2021, which is now the most viewed music video on his YouTube channel with over 83 million views.

In March 2021, Toto's debut album "Caméléon" was ranked among the top 6 global album debuts worldwide by Spotify, an unprecedented achievement for any Arab singer. In the same year, the artist entered the Forbes list of music stars in the Arab world, which includes the 50 most successful singers and bands of 2021.

In 2021, he was awarded with the title of both most streamed Arab artist and most streamed artist in the MENA region by Spotify.

As Morocco's main sport is football, Toto has found a liking to it, being a supporter of Wydad AC (revealed in Salade Coco).

On 12 May 2022 while performing at the Megarama Casablanca, ElGrandeToto received his first music recording certification from his collaboration with the Nigerian Afrobeats singer CKay on the remix of his 2021 hit song Love Nwantiti. It was certified diamond in France by the SNEP with more than 15 million streams from premium accounts, making ElGrandeToto the first Moroccan artist performing in Darija to achieve a diamond certification in France.

ElGrandeToto is currently under an exclusive license agreement with RCA Records, a division of Sony Music France.

Toto's management team includes Anissa Jalab, former manager rappers Damso and Manal and head of Wagram Belgium.

Controversies 
In October 2022, Taha Fahssi publicly apologized after sparking a controversy about cannabis consumption during a festival's press conference in September 2022, where he defended his recreational use of the drug as following : "I smoke hash -- so what? [...] It does not mean I set a bad example".

Following these events, The rapper was taken into custody after complaints were filed by "three artists, a journalist, and a policeman". An investigation is yet to be made by the authorities focusing on all his publications, digital content and statements "likely to contain elements punishable by law". Taha's lawyer stated that his client should not be used as a tool to "settle political scores".

Later, most complaints were withdrawn, and the public prosecution office in Casablanca decided to release the rapper with a 20,000 MAD bail. Taha is yet to appear before the Ain Sebaa Court. On 18 January 2023, A court in Casablanca sentenced Toto to serve an 8 month suspended prison sentence, in addition to paying a fine of MAD10,000.

Discography

Albums
 Illicit (2018)
 Caméléon (2021)

Singles 
 7elmet Ado (2016)
 Haribo (2017)
 Invalide (featuring Drizzy)  (2017)
 SMOU7AT (2017)
 Pablo (2017)
 9awdooha (feat. Lferda) (2017)
 Loco (2017)
 7elmetado 2 (2018)
 Apache (2018)
 Versus (2018)
 Piccola (2018)
 Jme3 O Twi (2018)
 7elmetAdo3 (2018)
 Bidaoui (2019)
 Groupies (2019)
 7elmet Ado 4 (2019)
 Hors Série (feat. Khtek, Don Bigg & Draganov) [RapRapRapRap] (2020)
 VitamineDZ (2020)
 Confiné (2020)
 Haram (Pablo II) (2021)
 Salade Coco (2021)
 7elmet Ado 5 (2022)
 Salina (c'est La Rue) [feat. Stormy, Khtek, Abduh, 7liwa, Vargas, OUENZA, Figoshin, Dollypran & Smallx] (with Tagne and Draganov) (2022)
 Comforter (ft. Ayra Starr) (2022)
 Gueule tapée (2022)
 Silhouette (2022)
 7elmet ado 6 (2022)
 Low (feat. ASHE 22) (2023)

Appears On 

 Nharzin (by A.L.A feat. ElGrandeToto) (2017)
 Bavra (by ISSAM feat. ElGrandeToto) (2018)
 Machakil (by Tagne feat. ElGrandeToto) (2018)
 Tcha Ra (by Shayfeen feat. Ouenza, ElGrandeToto, Madd & West) (2018)
 Enemyz (by Madd ft. ElGrandeToto) (2018)
 Slay (by Manal feat. ElGrandeToto) (2018)
 Games (by Madd ft. ElGrandeToto) (2018)
 Kennedy (by Bezza ft. ElGrandeToto) (2019)
 Mira (by Anas ft. ElGrandeToto) (2019)
 Chiico (by Dollypran ft. ElGrandeToto) (2019)
 Og Love (by Piketao feat. Tukko21 & ElGrandeToto) (2020)
 Ddd (by Don Bigg X ElGrandeToto) (2020)
 Criminel (by Fays & ElGrandeToto) (2020)
 Love Nwantiti [North African Remix] (by CKay featuring ElGrandeToto) (2021)
 La Rue (by Maestro feat. ElGrande Toto) (2021)
 Msh Khalsa (by Wegz featuring ElGrandeToto) (2021)
 Ok Wait (by OUENZA feat. ElGrandeToto) (2021)
 DNT (by Nouvo feat. ElGrandeToto & Draganov) (2021)
 PAPA (by Tiiwtiiw feat. ElGrandeToto) (2021)
 How High (by Skizo featuring Moro & ElGrandeToto) (2022)
 Fumigène (by Seven binks ft. ElGrandeToto, Bolémvn, Koba LaD) (2022)
 Casablanca (by Demi Portion ft. ElGrandeToto) (2022)
 Hola Ouais (by Yanso ft. ElGrandeToto) (2022)
 Gova (by marouane feat. ElGrandeToto) (2022)

Leaked songs 

 Indomie (Prod By Hades) - 2019
 ALCOOLIQUE (by Hades) - 2019
 CINEMA - 2019
 Piano (Prod by West) - 2019

References

Living people
1996 births
Moroccan rappers
Controversies in Morocco